Xanthoconium stramineum is a species of bolete fungus and the type species of the genus Xanthoconium. First described as a species of Gyroporus by William Alphonso Murrill in 1940, it was placed in its current genus by Rolf Singer in 1944.

See also
List of North American boletes

References

External links

Boletaceae
Fungi described in 1940
Taxa named by William Alphonso Murrill